Ghinești may refer to several villages in Romania:

 Ghinești, a village in Sălcioara Commune, Dâmbovița County
 Ghinești, a village in Neaua Commune, Mureș County